Albert Hackley was an American Negro league shortstop in the 1890s.

Hackley played for the Chicago Unions in 1894 and again in 1896. In three recorded career games, he posted six hits in 13 plate appearances.

References

External links
Baseball statistics and player information from Baseball-Reference Black Baseball Stats and Seamheads

Year of birth missing
Year of death missing
Place of birth missing
Place of death missing
Chicago Unions players